Dominique Olivia Parrish (born November 5, 1996) is an American freestyle wrestler. She won the gold medal in the women's 53kg event at the 2022 World Wrestling Championships held in Belgrade, Serbia. She also won the gold medal in her event at the 2022 Pan American Wrestling Championships held in Acapulco, Mexico.

In 2022, she won one of the bronze medals in the women's 53kg event at the Yasar Dogu Tournament held in Istanbul, Turkey. She competed at the 2022 Tunis Ranking Series event held in Tunis, Tunisia.

Achievements

References

External links 
 

Living people
1996 births
Place of birth missing (living people)
American female sport wrestlers
Pan American Wrestling Championships medalists
World Wrestling Champions
21st-century American women